Goniobranchus is a genus of sea slugs, dorid nudibranchs, shell-less marine gastropod molluscs in the family Chromodorididae.

Taxonomic history
Goniobranchus was described by Pease in 1866 but treated as a synonym of Chromodoris until 2012 when it was brought back into use for a clade revealed by molecular (DNA) techniques.

Species
Species in the genus Goniobranchus include:

Species brought into synonymy
 Goniobranchus godeffroyanus (Bergh, 1877): synonym of Hypselodoris godeffroyana (Bergh, 1977)
 Goniobranchus naiki (Valdés, Mollo & Ortea, 1999): synonym of Goniobranchus bombayanus (Winckworth, 1946)

References

Chromodorididae
Gastropod genera
Taxa named by William Harper Pease